I Decided may refer to:
 I Decided (album), a studio album by Big Sean
 "I Decided" (song), a 2008 single by Solange